PC Brian John Bishop (24 July 1947 – 27 August 1984) was a British police officer who was shot in the head by an armed robber in Frinton-on-Sea, Essex, on 22 August 1984. He died from his injuries five days later in a London hospital.

Background
Brian Bishop joined the former Essex Constabulary in 1962 as a fifteen-year-old cadet. Bishop was 6 ft 7 in tall when he became PC 389 on 11 August 1966 and was posted to Colchester. He joined the dog section as a handler in 1968 and moved to the Force Support Unit in 1975. Later, he became a firearms instructor. He had been assigned to the rank of Acting Sergeant before he died.

Death
The epitaph next to Bishop's memorial stone summarises the circumstances surrounding his death as follows:

Five days after the shooting in Central Avenue near Frinton's seafront took place, Bishop died at St. Bartholomew's Hospital in Smithfield, London, on 27 August 1984. His colleague Sergeant Mervyn Fairweather, who was shot in the groin in the same incident, later recovered.

Conviction
Colin Richards, a 35-year-old man from Brentwood, was arrested at the scene after another of Bishop's colleagues returned fire. Richards's injuries resulted in paralysis from the waist downwards. He was found guilty of Bishop's murder and of wounding Fairweather (having been charged with the latter's attempted murder) at Norwich Crown Court on 19 July 1985, and was sentenced to life imprisonment with a minimum tariff of 20 years.

Memorial
On 19 February 1986, the then Home Secretary, Douglas Hurd, unveiled a brown granite memorial stone adjacent to the seafront site where Bishop was shot. Bishop's memorial was only the third to be funded and erected by the Police Memorial Trust, and was the first to be sited outside London.

See also
List of British police officers killed in the line of duty

References

External links
Essex Police Memorial Trust: Brian 'Bill' Bishop

Murder in Essex
1984 murders in the United Kingdom
1984 in England
1980s in Essex
Deaths by firearm in England
August 1984 events in the United Kingdom
British police officers killed in the line of duty